Shoot to Kill is a novel written by Steve Cole, the first continuation entry in the Young Bond series. Cole took over from Charlie Higson, who left the series in 2009 after his final instalment A Hard Man to Kill. Shoot to Kill features Ian Fleming's spy James Bond in his teenage years, finding himself troubled in the outskirts of Los Angeles, having recently been expelled from Eton. It was followed by Heads You Die in May 2016.

Plot
Before leaving, a new school friend discovers some shocking film footage which propels James Bond and company on an adventure.

See also
 Outline of James Bond

References

External links
 Official Young Bond website
 - Full Shoot to Kill coverage

2014 British novels
Young Bond novels
Eton College
Novels set in Los Angeles
Random House books